The Red Willow County Courthouse is a historic building in McCook, Nebraska, which serves as the courthouse of Red Willow County, Nebraska. Two prior county courthouses were built in Indianola, Nebraska, in 1873 and 1880, followed by a third one in McCook, built in 1896. The current courthouse was built in 1926. It was designed by architect Marcus L. Evans in the Classical Revival style, with "symmetric arrangement, monumental proportions, smooth stone surface, prominent columns, unadorned parapet, rusticated and ashlar finish, and such classical elements as acroteria, fluted Doric columns, rosettes, and triglyphs." It has been listed on the National Register of Historic Places since July 5, 1990.

References

External links

	
National Register of Historic Places in Red Willow County, Nebraska
Neoclassical architecture in Nebraska
Government buildings completed in 1926
County courthouses in Nebraska
Courthouses on the National Register of Historic Places in Nebraska